George S. Logan (born March 5, 1969) is an American politician and member of the Republican Party. He served as a member of the Connecticut State Senate from 2017 to 2021. He was the Republican nominee for Connecticut's 5th congressional district in the 2022 United States House of Representatives elections in Connecticut, ultimately losing to Jahana Hayes by less than one percentage point.

Childhood

George Logan was born in New Haven, Connecticut, to parents who had immigrated from Guatemala but whose own parents were from Jamaica.

Education 

Logan graduated from Notre Dame High School. He earned a Bachelor of Science degree in engineering from Trinity College and a Master of Science in mechanical engineering from the University of Bridgeport.

Political career

State Senate 
He served as a member of the Connecticut State Senate representing Connecticut's 17th district in the State Senate. Logan was first elected in 2016, upsetting 24-year incumbent Democrat Joseph Crisco Jr. in 2018, he was reelected after a recount over labor union activist Jorge Cabrera.  On November 3, 2020, he was narrowly defeated by Cabrera in a rematch. He conceded on November 5.

2022 U.S. House campaign 
On July 21, 2021, Logan announced a run for the 2022 United States House of Representatives elections in Connecticut challenging Democratic incumbent Jahana Hayes in Connecticut's 5th congressional district. Logan lost by 1,842 votes out of over 250,000; an automatic recount would have taken place if the margin were under 1,250 votes. The Hartford Courant attributed his defeat to Hayes' victory in the relatively affluent middle-class suburbs of the Northwest Corner and the Farmington Valley. Those areas were previously reliably won by Nancy Johnson, the most recent Republican to represent the 5th district.

Personal life 

Logan is also the frontman for the Jimi Hendrix tribute band Electric Lady Band, which often plays in Connecticut venues such as Toad's Place in New Haven. He is married and has two children.

References 

1969 births
20th-century African-American people
21st-century African-American politicians
21st-century American politicians
African-American state legislators in Connecticut
Black conservatism in the United States
Candidates in the 2022 United States House of Representatives elections
Republican Party Connecticut state senators
Living people
People from Ansonia, Connecticut